Robert Grayson may refer to:

 Marvel Boy (Robert Grayson), a fictional superhero in Marvel Comics
 Robert Grayson (comedian), New York-born comedian based in Australia
 Bobby Grayson, American football player

See also
 Robert Grayson Littlejohn, American physicist